Cillian Willis (born 19 January 1985) is a former professional rugby union footballer. His primary position was scrum-half.

He was born in Dublin and educated at Blackrock College in Williamstown and University College Dublin, where in 2006 he completed a commerce degree with honours.

Willis broke through into the Leinster team due to injuries to Chris Whittaker and Guy Easterby early on in the 2006/2007 season. His performances earned him the Leinster Player of the Month Award for October/November.  Willis is also cousin to Brian O'Driscoll. In July 2010, Willis signed a new contract with Connacht Rugby and joined his new squad on their pre-season training trip on the Aran Islands. He left Connacht after one season and with Eoin Reddan and Isaac Boss both called into the Irish World Cup squad he was given a contract until October 2011 by Leinster. Willis signed for Sale Sharks for the 2011/2012 season.

References

External links
Leinster Profile
Ulster Profile
Connacht Profile

1985 births
Living people
Irish rugby union players
Alumni of University College Dublin
University College Dublin R.F.C. players
Greystones RFC players
Leinster Rugby players
Ulster Rugby players
Connacht Rugby players
People educated at Blackrock College
Irish expatriate rugby union players
Irish expatriate sportspeople in England
Expatriate rugby union players in England
Sale Sharks players
Rugby union scrum-halves
Rugby union players from Dublin (city)